Ramón Melendi Espina (born 21 January 1979), known as Melendi, is a Spanish singer-songwriter. His specialties are rock, flamenco, and rumba styles.

Early life 
He was born in Oviedo, Asturias. He went to class with Formula One race car driver Fernando Alonso, to whom he dedicated the song "Magic Alonso". He also did racing for a while but he realized very quickly that he was not made for racing nor studying, but he was good at football. He played in the lower ranks of Astur CF, at the time a reserve team for Real Oviedo. Afterwards, he worked as a waiter in several bars and spent all night out, living experiences that would later go on to make up the lyrics of his songs. In 2001, he joined a group called "El bosque de Sherwood", and soon after recorded a demo with only three songs, "Sin noticias de Holanda", "El informe del forense", and "Vuelvo a traficar".

Career

2003–2006: Career beginnings 
In February 2003, Melendi released his first solo disc called "Sin noticias de Holanda", with twelve songs. In December 2003, this disc was rereleased with two new songs, "Asturias" and "Moratalá". However, he reached true fame with the 2004 Vuelta a España chose his song "Con la luna llena" as its official theme. In May 2004, he started a small tour around Spain, selling 50,000 copies of his CD, making it a Gold Album.

In 2005, he released his second solo CD, "Que el cielo espere sentao", which has sold more than 200,000 copies. Later that same year, he rereleased the album with three new songs, "El Nano", "La dama y el vagabundo" and "Carlota", and a Live concert DVD recorded in Oviedo. He also became a father that year, and received the Onda award for Best Song of the Year for "Caminando por la vida". In November 2005, he received seven Platinum Discs for his two albums. "Sin noticias..." received four and "Que el cielo..." three.

In 2006, it was announced that he would be one of the main stars in the PSP game "Gangs of London". Melendi played Mr. Big, an evil gangster. He also wrote the song "Gangs of London" for the occasion, going on to film a video amidst police lights and sirens. The videogame was launched on 1 August of that year in the UK and on 6 September in Spain; EMI stepped in to distribute his CDs worldwide. He also wrote the song "Volveremos" (We Shall Return) for Real Oviedo. The singer is also involved in the production of the film "Vuelvo a traficar: The Film" (I'm Dealing Again). "Mientras no cueste trabajo" was released on 13 November 2006, in two formats: a normal CD with 12 songs, and a special edition, with 16 songs and a DVD with extras. The disc was rereleased on 29 October 2009, with four new songs, "Firmes", "El rey de la baraja", "La aceituna", and "Me gusta el fútbol".

2007–2010: Curiosa la cara de tu padre and Volvamos a empezar 
In 2007, he received the "Best Tour" award from the "Premios de la Música" ceremony held in Cordoba. He also did an advertising campaign for Canal+ Spain entitled "Me gusta el fútbol" (I Like Football), for which he wrote a song of the same name. In 2007, he stood trial for provoking an incident while under the influence of alcohol on a flight from Madrid to Mexico City that required the pilot to return to Madrid two hours after takeoff. He was released after testifying. Soon after, he was given the "Left Foot" award from Spanish radio station Cadena 100 for this incident.

Currently, Melendi directs his Blue Donkey Music company, helping young singers start their careers. He's offered contracts to four groups, Algunos Hombres Buenos, Rasel, La Dama y Belo, and Los Susodichos. This last group was nominated for a Latin Grammy for Best Rock Vocals. Algunos Hombres Buenos left the label in 2008. On 9 August 2008, he presented his new single, "Un violinista en tu tejado" from his album Curiosa la cara de tu padre on Spanish radio station Los 40 Principales. The album was released on 16 September 2008. On 12 December, Los 40 Principales awarded him their award for this album.

On 17 December 2009, he released a new double CD, Aún más curiosa la cara de tu padre, including the original disc and another with nine new songs and links to exclusive content on his website.

2011–2015: Lágrimas desordenadas, Un alumno más and Directo a septiembre 
In 2011, he recorded a cover of "True colours" by Cyndi Lauper in Catalan called "Ulls dolços", for the CD of TV3's telethon La Marató.

On 13 November 2012, he released a new album called Lágrimas desordenadas and went on a tour of Spain and Latin America later that same year to celebrate the 10th anniversary of his first solo album.

His latest album, Un alumno más was released on 25 November 2014. Over the four months before the album was released, two songs from the album were released as lyrics videos, one was released as a single (Tocado y hundido), and one was released in an acoustic version.

2016–2018: Quítate las gafas and Ahora 
In 2016, he issued Quítate las gafas, which featuring collaboration with ChocQuibTown. The first single from the album was "Desde Que Estamos Juntos"; released on 23 September 2016. The other songs released were "La Casa No Es Igual", "Destino o Casualidad" and "Yo Me Veo Contigo". On 2 June 2017, he released remix version of "Destino o Casualidad" with American duo Ha*Ash, along with the music video. On 8 December 2017, he released a second compilations albums Yo me veo contigo. The album includes a set of 11 songs, and would be made available on 4 CD and DVD.

Qúitate las gafas album:
 Flores de agua y plomo
 Destino o casualidad
 Hijos del mal
 Desde que estamos juntos
 La casa no es igual
 Mi mayor fortuna – Feat. Choc quib town
 Soy tu superhéroe
 Existen los ángeles
 Quítate las gafas
 Yo me veo contigo

Ahora album:
 Mírame
 El arrepentido (con Carlos Vives)
 Lo que nos merecemos
 Para que no se escapen tus mariposas
 Tiempos de re-evolución
 Déjala que baile (con Alejandro Sanz y Arkano)
 Mi código postal
 Negro sin ti
 Habitaciones de un mismo planeta
 Lo nuestro fue muy top
 Como el agua y el aceite

2019–present: 10:20:40 
In October 2019, the singer joined as coach of the second Mexican season of La Voz Kids by Televisa. On 29 November 2019, he released a new album called 10:20:40, which featuring collaboration with Cali y El Dandee.

Private life 
In his early years, the fake news announcing his alleged death from an overdose or in the middle of shootings were also known. 
In 2005, Melendi became the father for the first time of a girl named Carlota.

In 2014 he met the Argentine actress and dancer Julia Nakamatsu, who later appeared in the singer's video "La promesa".

In 2023 Melendi revealed that his grandfather is originally from Camaguey, Cuba.

Discography

Albums

Studio albums

Live albums

Compilations albums

Extended plays

Singles

Collaborations 

 José Avilés Bas: "Volveremos Real Oviedo" (2013)
 Los Chunguitos: "Con la luna llena" (2004).
 Pablo Moro: "María" (2005).
 Algunos Hombres Buenos: "Salta" (2006).
 Seguridad Social: "Quiero tener tu presencia" (live, unedited).
 Belo: "Al gallo que me cante" (live, unedited).
 Un tributo a Brasil: "Adiós tristeza".
 Rasel "Mil razas" (2007).
 Guaraná: "De lao a lao" (2008).
 Pignoise: "Estoy enfermo" (2009).
 Fernando Tejero: "So payaso" (2010).
 Porretas: "Dos pulgas en un perro" (2011).
 Juanes: "Me enamora" (2011; live, unedited).
 Mojinos Escozíos y Ariel Rot: "Al carajo" (2011).
 Pablo Motos: "Marco" (2011).
 Malú: El apagón (2011) (live, unedited). 
 Leonel García: "Para empezar" (2011; live, unedited).
 Pablo Alborán, Dani Martín, Malú, Carlos Baute, Rasel y La Dama: "Cuestión de prioridades por el cuerno de África" (2012).
 Malú: "Amigo" (2012).
 Lolita Flores: "Arriba los corazones", by Antonio Flores (live, unedited).
 Malú: "Con solo una sonrisa" (live, unedited).
 La Dama: "Corazón de peón" (live, unedited).
 Rasel: "Por qué" (2013).
 La Dama: "Estrella fugaz" (2014).
 Margarett: "Por ti" (2014).
 Laura Pausini: "Entre tú y mil mares" (2014).
 Antonio Orozco, Manuel Carrasco, Malú, Alejandro Sanz: "Mi Héroe" (2016)
 Ha*Ash: "Destino o Casualidad" (2017)
 Carlos Vives: "El Arrepentido" (2018)
 Beret :"Desde Cero" (2019)

References

External links 
 
Melendi's own record label
Melendi's discography

 
1979 births
Living people
Singers from Asturias
EMI Records artists
Sony Music Spain artists
Flamenco singers
People from Oviedo
Pop rock singers
Rock en Español musicians
Spanish pop singers
Spanish rock singers
21st-century Spanish singers
21st-century Spanish male singers
Latin music songwriters